Sarah Lassez  is a French-American-Canadian actress and author.  She was born in Canada to French parents and raised in Australia. At the age of 14, she moved to New York City and currently lives in Los Angeles.

Sarah Lassez is best known for her work in Gregg Araki's Nowhere, Abel Ferrara's The Blackout and the underground cult hit Mad Cowgirl.

Her memoir, Psychic Junkie, was published by Simon & Schuster in the summer of 2006.  It was featured on the cover of The New York Times Sunday Styles section, Entertainment Weekly, People Magazine and The Today Show. She has the lead role in the horror musical The Dead Inside, directed by Travis Betz.

Selected filmography
 Roosters (1993)
 The Shaggy Dog (1994)
 Malicious (1995)
 Nowhere (1997)
 The Blackout (1997)
 The Clown at Midnight (1998)
 The Outfitters (1999)
 Sleeping Beauties (1999)
 Rien, Voila l'Ordre (2003)
 Until the Night (2004)
 Mad Cowgirl (2006)
 Lo (2008) 
 The Dead Inside (2011)

Personal life
Her Great-Grandfather was the French/Polish cubist painter Louis Marcoussis.  Her grandfather Jacques Besse composed several songs for Edith Piaf as well as the music for the films Dédée d’Anvers d’Yves Allégret, Van Gogh d’Alain Resnais and the theatrical play Les Mouches by Jean-Paul Sartre.

References

External links
 
 Official Sarah Lassez website

Canadian emigrants to Australia
Australian emigrants to the United States
Actresses from Quebec
Canadian film actresses
People from Sherbrooke
Living people
Year of birth missing (living people)